Piano Solo is a 1954 album by jazz pianist and composer Thelonious Monk, recorded in Paris, France, on June 4, 1954, originally for a radio broadcast.

The original album was released on the French Disques Vogue label as a 10" LP. Several of the song titles were listed inaccurately on the original release, and Monk's first name included an extra 'o'. The material has been re-released over the years, under a number of titles, on GNP Crescendo and other labels.  Some releases include "Hackensack" as an additional track, sometimes listed inaccurately as "Well You Needn't (take 2)."

A 2017 re-release by Sony contains all tracks from the original, but in recording order (now reported as being from Club d'Essai, Paris—this was the location of the recording studio); plus, for the first time, an announcement by André Francis. This edition also includes previously unreleased tracks from Monk's June 1 and 3, 1954 trio concerts at the Salle Pleyel, Paris.

Track listing
All compositions by Thelonious Monk except where indicated.

Side 1
 'Round About Midnight
 Evidence [originally listed as "Reflections"]
 Smoke Gets in Your Eyes (Jerome Kern)
 Well You Needn't

Side 2
 Reflections [originally listed as "Portrait Of An Ermite"] 
 We See [originally listed as "Manganése"]
 Eronel
 Off Minor

2017 Sony expanded release

 	Introduction by André Francis 	0:52
 	Evidence 	3:05
 	Smoke Gets in Your Eyes 	3:27
 	Hackensack 	3:04
 	'Round Midnight 	5:18
 	Eronel 	2:34
 	Off Minor 	2:34
 	Well, You Needn't 	3:28
 	Portrait of an Ermite (Reflections) 	5:00
 	Manganese (We See) 	2:36
 	Announcement (Presenter – Jacques Souplet) 1:31
 	Well, You Needn't (Live At Salle Pleyel, 6/1/1954) 	6:02
 	'Round Midnight (Live At Salle Pleyel, 6/1/1954) 	5:18
 	Off Minor (Live At Salle Pleyel, 6/1/1954) 	5:10
 	Hackensack / Epistrophy (Live At Salle Pleyel, 6/1/1954) 	3:32
 	'Round Midnight (Incomplete) (Live At Salle Pleyel, 6/3/1954) 	2:56

Personnel

Bass – Jean-Marie Ingrand (tracks 11 to 16)
Drums – Jean-Louis Viale (tracks 11 to 15)
Drums [Probably] – Gérard "Dave" Pochonet (tracks 16)

References

Thelonious Monk albums
1954 albums
Prestige Records albums